

List of Ambassadors

Oren Anolik 2021-
Shmuel (Sammy) Revel (2017-)
Yael Ravia-Zadok 2015 - 2017
Michael Harari (diplomat) 2010 - 2015
Avraham Haddad 2006 - 2010
Zvi Cohen-Litant 2004 - 2006
Michael Eligal 2000 - 2004
Shemi Tzur 1993 - 2000
David Granit 1992 - 1993
Aharon Lopez 1987 - 1992
Amos Shtibel 1986 - 1987
Meir Gavish 1984 - 1986
Zeev Dover 1981 - 1983
Avraham Giladi 1979 - 1981
Nissim Yosha 1974 - 1977
Charge d'Affaires a.i. Mordechai David Palzur

References

Cyprus
Israel